Asleep at Heaven's Gate is the third album by American indie rock band Rogue Wave. It was released to average reviews on September 18, 2007. It was produced by Roger Moutenot. "Lake Michigan", the first single from the album, was featured in a TV commercial for Microsoft's second-generation Zune music players, and was included on the original soundtrack of The Secret Life of Walter Mitty. "Electro-Socket Blues" is a bonus track and can be found on the UK release of the album, whilst “The Show”, “I Can Die", "Electro-Socket Blues", and “All You Need Is Love”, are all available on the remastered and expanded version of the album, which can be found on iTunes. “Chicago x 12” is also featured in the eighth season of Scrubs in the episode “Their Story II”.

Track listing
All songs written by Zach Rogue.
 "Harmonium" – 6:36
 "Like I Needed" – 3:02
 "Chicago X 12" – 5:39
 "Lake Michigan" – 3:48
 "Lullaby" – 4:01
 "Christians in Black" – 3:54
 "Own Your Own Home" – 5:04
 "Ghost" – 5:11
 "Missed" – 3:29
 "Fantasies" – 4:30
 "Phonytown" – 5:56
 "Cheaper Than Therapy" – 5:30
 "The Show" (Bonus Track) – 4:24
 "I Can Die" (Bonus Track) – 3:39
 "Electro-Socket Blues" (Bonus Track) – 3:59
 "All You Need Is Love" (Bonus Track) – 3:25

References

2007 albums
Rogue Wave (band) albums
Albums produced by Roger Moutenot
Brushfire Records albums